Hairspray is a 1988 American comedy film written and directed by John Waters, starring Ricki Lake, Divine, Debbie Harry, Sonny Bono, Jerry Stiller, Leslie Ann Powers, Colleen Fitzpatrick, Michael St. Gerard, and Ruth Brown. Hairspray was a dramatic departure from Waters's earlier works, with a much broader intended audience. Hairsprays PG is the least restrictive rating a Waters film has received; most of his previous films were rated X by the MPAA. Set in 1962 Baltimore, Maryland, the film revolves around self-proclaimed "pleasantly plump" teenager Tracy Turnblad as she pursues stardom as a dancer on a local TV show and rallies against racial segregation.

Hairspray was only a moderate success upon its initial theatrical release, earning a modest gross of $8 million. However, it managed to attract a larger audience on home video in the early 1990s and became a cult film. The film received critical acclaim and ranks at No. 444 on Empire magazine's 2008 list of the 500 greatest movies of all time.

It is Divine’s final film released during his lifetime, as he died three weeks after its release.

In 2002, the film was adapted into a Broadway musical of the same name, which won eight Tony Awards, including Best Musical in 2003. A second film version of Hairspray, an adaptation of the stage musical, was also released by New Line Cinema in 2007, which included many changes of scripted items from the original. 

In 2022, the film was selected for preservation in the United States National Film Registry by the Library of Congress as being "culturally, historically, or aesthetically significant".

Plot
In Baltimore, Maryland in the year 1962, Tracy Turnblad and her best friend, Penny Pingleton, audition for The Corny Collins Show, a popular Baltimore teenage dance show (based on the real-life Buddy Deane Show). Penny nervously stumbles over her answers, and another girl, Nadine Carver, is cut for being Black (the show has a "Negro Day" on the last Thursday of every month, she is told). Tracy’s dance moves earn her a spot as a regular on the show, infuriating the show's reigning queen, Amber Von Tussle, a mean, privileged, thin, beautiful high school classmate whose racist parents, Velma and Franklin Von Tussle, own Tilted Acres Amusement Park which bans African Americans. Tracy steals Amber's boyfriend, Link Larkin, and competes against her for the title of Miss Auto Show 1963, fuelling Amber's hatred of her.

Tracy's growing confidence leads to her being hired as a plus-size model for the Hefty Hideaway clothing store owned by Mr. Pinky. She is also inspired to bleach, tease, and rat her big hair into styles popular in the 1960s. At school, a geometry teacher brands her hairdo a "hair-don't" and sends her to the principal's office, from which Tracy is sent to special education classes, where she befriends Black classmates sent there to hold them back academically. The students introduce Tracy to Motormouth Maybelle, an R&B record shop owner and host of the monthly "Negro Day" on The Corny Collins Show. They teach Tracy, Penny, and Link dance moves such as The Bird and The Dirty Boogie and Penny begins an interracial romance with Motormouth Maybelle's son, Seaweed. This horrifies Penny's parents, Prudence and Paddy, who imprison her in her bedroom and hire quack psychiatrist Dr. Frederickson to brainwash her into dating white boys and opposing integration. Seaweed later helps her break out of the house and run away, and it is implied that her parents have disowned her.

Undeterred, Tracy uses her newfound fame to advocate for racial integration, aided by Motormouth Maybelle, Corny Collins, his assistant Tammy, and her own agoraphobic, slightly overbearing, overweight mother, Edna. After a race riot at Tilted Acres, where The Corny Collins Show is live from that day, results in Tracy's arrest, the Von Tussles grow more defiantly opposed to racial integration. Their plot to sabotage the Miss Auto Show 1963 pageant with a bomb hidden in Velma's towering bouffant wig literally backfires when the bomb detonates prematurely, and the Von Tussles are captured by the Baltimore police for their hate crimes. Tracy, who had won the crown but was disqualified for being in reform school, dethrones Amber after the governor of Maryland pardons her. She then comes to the pageant, integrates The Corny Collins Show, and encourages everyone to dance in celebration.

Cast

Council members

Special appearances
 Ric Ocasek as the Beatnik cat
 Pia Zadora as the Beatnik chick

Production
John Waters wrote the screenplay under the title of White Lipstick, with the story loosely based on real events. The Corny Collins Show is based on the real-life Buddy Deane Show, a local dance party program which pre-empted Dick Clark's American Bandstand in the Baltimore area during the 1950s and early 1960s. Waters had previously written about The Buddy Deane Show in his 1983 book Crackpot: The Obsessions of John Waters.

Principal photography took place in and around the Baltimore area during the summer of 1987. The school scenes were filmed at Perry Hall High School with set locations including the library, a first-floor English class, and the principal's office. In the scene set in the principal's office, the Harry Dorsey Gough (see Perry Hall Mansion) coat-of-arms that once hung in the main lobby can be seen through the doorway. The scenes set at Tilted Acres amusement park were filmed at Dorney Park & Wildwater Kingdom in Allentown, Pennsylvania.

According to Debbie Harry, Waters wanted her to perform music for the film as well as act in it, but the record label she was signed to objected.

Hairspray was Divine's final film to be released in his lifetime; he died on March 7, 1988, three weeks after the film's premiere and nine days after the film's release. Hairspray was his only film with Waters in which he didn't play the lead. Originally, Divine was considered to play both Tracy Turnblad and her mother Edna. Executives from New Line Cinema, the film's distributor, discouraged this concept, and it was eventually dropped. Instead Divine played Edna Turnblad and Arvin Hodgepile, the racist TV station manager.

According to BusinessInsider.com, Hairspray became the most popular movie set in Maryland.

Deleted scenes
A handful of scenes were cut while in post-production, some of which provided context for certain plot developments seen in the finished film.

The first scene occurs before Tracy and Penny go the Parkville VFW record hop. Tracy is required to start her first shift working in the Hardy-Har Joke Shop. But after managing to scare away all her customers she is excused to go to the hop. The joke shop customers are still listed in the end credits of the final cut.

An additional scene that was removed shows Tracy skipping school, stealing shoes from the Etta Gown Shop, breaking into the Von Tussles' home, and using a bottle of Amber's peroxide to bleach her hair in Amber's sink, thus explaining Tracy's subsequent change of hair color when she auditions for The Corny Collins Show.

Another deleted scene involved cockroaches being placed in Tracy's hair. Although removed prior to the film's theatrical release, numerous references to the incident remain in the final edit, including the songs "The Roach" (1961) by Gene and Wendell and "The Bug" (1958) by Jerry Dallman and the Knightcaps, as well as Tracy arriving to be crowned "Miss Auto Show" wearing an evening gown appliqued with black satin cockroaches. When discussing his decision to ultimately cut the scene, Waters explained "Bob Shaye, the head of New Line, probably correctly, said 'This doesn't work. What is this, a Buñuel movie?'...And he was probably right."

The final deleted scene was a musical number which depicted the teens performing an obscure 1960s dance called "The Stupidity" at the auto show just before Tracy's being released from reform school, but again, Waters ultimately decided it wasn't appropriate, stating "I thought, you know, you don't want your leading man to look stupid right in the big finale."

Reception

Critical response
Hairspray received three stars from critics Gene Siskel and Roger Ebert.

The film holds a 98% "certified fresh" rating on Rotten Tomatoes, based on 42 reviews with an average rating of 7.8/10. It is Waters' second-highest-rated film (behind Multiple Maniacs) on the website. The critical consensus states that "Hairspray is perhaps John Waters' most accessible film, and as such, it's a gently subversive slice of retro hilarity." John Waters wrote that his all-time favorite review of Hairspray was David Edelstein's in Rolling Stone: "A family movie both the Bradys and the Mansons could adore".

Box office
Hairspray opened on February 26, 1988 in 79 North American theaters, where it grossed 577,287 in its opening weekend. On March 11, it expanded to 227 theaters, where it grossed $966,672 from March 11–13. It ended its theatrical run with $8,271,108.

Awards
The film was nominated for six Independent Spirit Awards, and the Grand Jury Prize at the Sundance Film Festival.

Other works

Broadway musical

In mid-2002, Margo Lion teamed with writers Marc Shaiman and Thomas Meehan to turn Hairspray into a Broadway musical. The show opened on August 15, 2002 starring Marissa Jaret Winokur as Tracy and Harvey Fierstein as Edna. The show won eight Tony Awards, including Best Musical, in 2003. The show closed on January 4, 2009.

2007 film adaptation

In 2006, New Line Cinema joined forces with Adam Shankman to adapt the Broadway show into a movie musical. The film was released July 20, 2007, starring John Travolta as Edna, Michelle Pfeiffer as Velma, Christopher Walken as Wilbur, Amanda Bynes as Penny Pingleton, Brittany Snow as Amber Von Tussle, Queen Latifah as Motormouth Maybelle, James Marsden as Corny, Zac Efron as Link, and newcomer Nikki Blonsky as Tracy. The film had a $75 million budget and earned over $200 million worldwide.

2016 live television adaptation

NBC aired a television event of the acclaimed musical on December 7, 2016, starring Harvey Fierstein as Edna, Ariana Grande as Penny Pingleton, Kristin Chenoweth as Velma, Martin Short as Wilbur, Dove Cameron as Amber Von Tussle, Jennifer Hudson as Motormouth Maybelle, Derek Hough as Corny, Garrett Clayton as Link, and newcomer Maddie Baillio as Tracy. It was well received by critics and was seen by 9.05 million viewers, with a ratings share of 2.3 in the 18–49 demographic, and a 5.9 overnight household rating.

Soundtrack

The soundtrack was released in 1988 by MCA Records. The album featured one original song by Rachel Sweet and eleven other songs mostly from the early 1960s by Gene Pitney, Toussaint McCall and The Ikettes, and others. Two songs, "You Don't Own Me" and "Mama Didn't Lie", came out in 1963; "Nothing Takes the Place of You" was released in 1967.

Home media
Hairspray was issued for the first time on VHS and LaserDisc in 1989 by Warner Home Video. New Line reissued the film on VHS in 1996.

The film was released on DVD by New Line in 2002. The disc included an audio commentary by John Waters and Ricki Lake and a theatrical trailer. It was released on Blu-ray on March 4, 2014.

See also

 Civil rights movement in popular culture
 Cross-dressing in film and television

References

External links
 
 
 
 
 
 

1988 films
1988 independent films
1988 romantic comedy films
1980s American films
1980s dance films
1980s English-language films
1980s satirical films
1980s teen comedy films
1980s teen romance films
American dance films
American independent films
American romantic comedy films
American satirical films
American teen comedy films
American teen romance films
Civil rights movement in film
Films adapted into plays
Films about interracial romance
Films about television
Films directed by John Waters
Films set in 1962
Films set in Baltimore
Films shot in Baltimore
United States National Film Registry films